The 2023 USF Pro 2000 Championship is the 25th season in series history and the first under the USF Pro 2000 moniker. When the top rung of the Road to Indy ladder system, Indy Lights, was bought by Penske Entertainment (owners of INDYCAR) in 2021 and the lower level series changed sanctioning to the United States Auto Club, changes were made to the other championships in the ladder that resulted in the championship being rebranded for 2023. This, together with the Indy Lights being rebranded to Indy NXT, effectively ended the "Road to Indy" branding, with the three championships below Indy NXT now collectively called "USF Pro Championships Presented by Cooper Tires".

The three Andersen Promotions series continue to have tire contracts with the Goodyear Tire and Rubber Company, while the NTT IndyCar Series and Indy Lights have tire contracts with Bridgestone Corporation.

Series news 

 As part of the rebrand and new alignment of the ladder system, the scholarship for the champion was increased to $664,425.

Drivers and teams 
All drivers compete using Tatuus-built racecars.

Schedule 
The 2023 schedule was revealed on October 17, 2022. It features two street circuits, six road courses and one oval round. The championship will return to Sebring for the first time since 2010 (when it was called Star Mazda Championship) and will return to Austin for the first time since 2013 (when it was called Pro Mazda Championship). All rounds except the weekends at Sebring, Indianapolis Raceway Park and Circuit of the Americas are scheduled to support IndyCar.

Race results

Championship standings

Drivers' Championship 

 Scoring system

 The driver who qualifies on pole is awarded one additional point.
 One point is awarded to the driver who leads the most laps in a race.
 One point is awarded to the driver who sets the fastest lap during the race.

Teams' championship 

 Scoring system

 Single car teams receive 3 bonus points as an equivalency to multi-car teams
 Only the best two results count for teams fielding more than two entries

See also 

 2023 IndyCar Series
 2023 Indy NXT
 2023 USF2000 Championship
 2023 USF Juniors

References

External links 

 USF Pro 2000 Championship Official Website

2023
USF Pro 2000 Championship
USF Pro 2000 Championship
USF Pro 2000 Championship
USF Pro 2000 Championship